Medicine, Science and the Law is a quarterly peer-reviewed medical journal covering forensic medicine and science. It was established in 1960 and was originally published by Sweet & Maxwell; it is now published by SAGE Publications. It has been the official journal of the British Academy of Forensic Sciences since the journal and Academy were both established. The editor-in-chief is Peter Vanezis (Barts and The London School of Medicine and Dentistry). According to the Journal Citation Reports, the journal has a 2016 impact factor of 0.689, ranking it 90th out of 147 journals in the category "Law" and 12th out of 15 journals in the category "Medicine, Legal".

References

External links

SAGE Publishing academic journals
Quarterly journals
Publications established in 1960
Medical law journals
Forensic science journals
English-language journals
Academic journals associated with learned and professional societies of the United Kingdom